Spike of Bensonhurst is a 1988 American comedy drama and mafia film written and directed by Paul Morrissey and starring Sasha Mitchell. The film also features Ernest Borgnine, Maria Pitillo, and Talisa Soto.

Plot
The protagonist, Spike Fumo (Mitchell), is a young Italian-American man who lives in Bensonhurst, Brooklyn and aspires to be a boxer. However, he falls in love with a girl who turns out to be the daughter of a Mafia boss. As he is forced to leave, he moves to Red Hook, Brooklyn, a predominantly Puerto Rican section of Brooklyn, where he falls in love with a girl from that neighborhood.

Cast
 Sasha Mitchell as Spike Fumo
 Ernest Borgnine as Baldo Cacetti
 Anne De Salvo as Sylvia Cacetti
 Talisa Soto as India
 Frank Adonis as Vinaca 
 Rick Aviles as Bandanna
 Frank Gio as Pete Fumo 
 Rodney Harvey as Frankie
 Sylvia Miles as Congresswoman
 Maria Pitillo as Angel Cacetti
 Geraldine Smith as Helen Fumo

Awards and nominations
Independent Spirit Awards
1989: Nominated, "Best Supporting Male" - Ernest Borgnine

References

External links

1988 films
1988 comedy-drama films
American comedy-drama films
American boxing films
Films directed by Paul Morrissey
Films set in Brooklyn
American independent films
1980s English-language films
1980s American films